A list of species in the genus Omphalodes'.

The flowering plant genus Omphalodes is in the subfamily Boraginoideae of the family Boraginaceae.

Species
 Omphalodes acuminata B.L.Rob. -- Proc. Amer. Acad. Arts xxvi. (1891) 170. (IK)
 Omphalodes aliena A.Gray ex Hemsl. -- Biol. Cent.-Amer., Bot. ii. 377. (IK)
 Omphalodes amplexicaulis Lehm. -- Mag. Neuesten Entdeck. Gesammten Naturk. Ges. Naturf. Freunde Berlin 8: 98 (t. 3). 1818 (IK)
 Omphalodes aquatica Brand—Repert. Spec. Nov. Regni Veg. 13: 545. 1915 (IK)
 Omphalodes blepharolepis Maxim. -- in Bull. Acad. Petersb. xxvii. (1881) 504. (IK)
 Omphalodes bodinieri H.Lév. -- Repert. Spec. Nov. Regni Veg. 12: 188. 1913 (IK)
 Omphalodes cappadocica DC.
 Omphalodes cardiophylla A.Gray ex Hemsl. -- Biol. Cent.-Amer., Bot. ii. 377. (IK)
 Omphalodes caucasica Brand—Pflanzenr. (Engler) Borrag. Cynogloss. 109. 1921 (IK)
 Omphalodes cavaleriei H.Lév. -- Repert. Spec. Nov. Regni Veg. 12: 188. 1913 (IK)
 Omphalodes chekiangensis Migo—Bot. Mag. (Tokyo) lvi. 265 (1942). (IK)
 Omphalodes chiangii L.C.Higgins—Phytologia 33: 412. 1976 (GCI)
 Omphalodes ciliaris Brand—Repert. Spec. Nov. Regni Veg. 26: 172. 1929 (IK)
 Omphalodes cilicica Hausskn. ex Brand—Pflanzenr. (Engler) Borrag. Cynogloss. 107, in syn. 1921 (IK)
 Omphalodes commutata G.López -- Anales Jard. Bot. Madrid 37(1): 83. 1980 (IK)
 Omphalodes controversa DC. -- Prodr. (DC.) 10: 168. 1846 [8 Apr 1846] (IK)
 Omphalodes cordata Hemsl. -- J. Linn. Soc., Bot. xxvi. (1890) 148. (IK)
 Omphalodes cornifolia Lehm. -- Mag. Neuesten Entdeck. Gesammten Naturk. Ges. Naturf. Freunde Berlin 8: 97 (-98; t. 2). 1818 (IK)
 Omphalodes davisiana Kit Tan & Sorger—Pl. Syst. Evol. 154(1-2): 125. 1986 (IK)
 Omphalodes diffusa Maxim. -- in Bull. Acad. Petersb. xxvii. (1881) 504. (IK)
 Omphalodes erecta I.M.Johnst. -- J. Arnold Arbor. 16: 204. 1935 (GCI)
 Omphalodes esquirolii H.Lév. -- Repert. Spec. Nov. Regni Veg. 12: 188. 1913 (IK)
 Omphalodes formosana Masam. -- Journ. Soc. Trop. Agric., Taiwan 1930, ii. 240. (IK)
 Omphalodes forrestii Diels—Notes Roy. Bot. Gard. Edinburgh 5: 169. 1912 (IK)
 Omphalodes fortisii G.Don—Gen. Hist. iv. 352. (IK)
 Omphalodes glochidata Bunge—Beitr. Fl. Russl. 237 (1852). [7 Nov 1852] (IK)
 Omphalodes glochidiata Bunge—in Mem. Sav. Etr. Petersb. vii. (1847) 413. (IK)
 Omphalodes heterophylla Rech.f. & Riedl—Oesterr. Bot. Z. 110: 532. 1963 (IK)
 Omphalodes howardi A.Gray—Proc. Amer. Acad. Arts xx. (1885) 263. (IK)
 Omphalodes icumae Maxim. -- in Bull. Acad. Petersb. xvii. (1872) 453. (IK)
 Omphalodes japonica Maxim. -- in Bull. Acad. Petersb. xvii. (1872) 452. (IK)
 Omphalodes krameri Franch. & Sav. -- Enum. Pl. Jap. ii. 452. (IK)
 Omphalodes kusnezowii Kolak. -- Zametki Sist. Geogr. Rast. 14: 62. 1948 ; Not. Syst. (Tbilisi) (IK)
 Omphalodes kuzinskyanae Willk. -- Oesterr. Bot. Z. 39: 318. 1889 (IK)
 Omphalodes laevisperma Nakai—J. Jap. Bot. xxiii. 17 (1949). (IK)
 Omphalodes lateriflora J.F.Macbr. -- Proc. Amer. Acad. Arts li. 513 (1916). (IK)
 Omphalodes linifolia Moench—Methodus (Moench) 419. 1794 [4 May 1794] (IK)
 Omphalodes littoralis Lehm. -- Mag. Neuesten Entdeck. Gesammten Naturk. Ges. Naturf. Freunde Berlin 8: 97 (-99). 1818 (IK)
 Omphalodes lojkae Sommier & Levier—Act. Hort. Petrop. xii. (1892) 157. (IK)
 Omphalodes luciliae Boiss. -- Diagn. Pl. Orient. ser. 1, 4: 41. 1844 [Jun 1844] (IK)
 Omphalodes mairei H.Lév. -- Repert. Spec. Nov. Regni Veg. 12: 188. 1913 (IK)
 Omphalodes mexicana S.Watson—Proc. Amer. Acad. Arts xxv. (1890) 158. (IK)
 Omphalodes moupinensis Franch. -- Nouv. Arch. Mus. Hist. Nat. Ser. II, x. (1887) 64. (IK)
 Omphalodes nana A.Gray—Proc. Amer. Acad. Arts xx. (1885) 263. (IK)
 Omphalodes nitida Hoffmanns. & Link—Fl. Port. i. 194. t. 25. (IK)
 Omphalodes olgae Brand—Repert. Spec. Nov. Regni Veg. 26: 172. 1929 (IK)
 Omphalodes omphalodes Druce—in Rep. Bot. Exch. Cl. Brit. Isles, 1924, vii. 688 (1925). (IK)
 Omphalodes omphaloides (L.) Voss—Vilm. Blumengärtn., ed. 3. 1: 693. 1895 (IK)
 Omphalodes papillosa DC. -- Prodr. (DC.) 10: 159. 1846 [8 Apr 1846] (IK)
 Omphalodes pavoniana Boiss. -- Diagn. Pl. Orient. ser. 1, 11: 128. 1849 [Mar-Apr 1849] (IK)
 Omphalodes physodes Bunge—Beitr. Fl. Russl. 238 (1852). [7 Nov 1852] (IK)
 Omphalodes prolifera Ohwi—in Bull. Nat. Sci. Mus., Tokyo, n. s., iii. (No. 39) 98 (1956). (IK)
 Omphalodes richardsonii G.L.Nesom—Sida 13(1): 27. 1988 (IK)
 Omphalodes ripleyana P.H.Davis—Notes Roy. Bot. Gard. Edinburgh 22: 82. 1956 (IK)
 Omphalodes runemarkii Strid & Kit Tan—Phytol. Balcan. 11(1): 69 (-72; fig. 1). 2005 [Aug 2005]
 Omphalodes rupestris Rupr. ex Boiss. -- Fl. Orient. [Boissier] 4(1): 267. 1875 [Sep-Oct 1875] (IK)
 Omphalodes scorpioides Schrank—Denkschr. Akad. Muench. iii. (1812) 222. (IK)
 Omphalodes thomsonii C.B.Clarke—Fl. Brit. India [J. D. Hooker] iv. 155. (IK)
 Omphalodes trichocarpa Maxim. -- in Bull. Acad. Petersb. xxvi. (1880) 500. (IK)
 Omphalodes vaniotii H.Lév. -- Repert. Spec. Nov. Regni Veg. 12: 188. 1913 (IK)
 Omphalodes verna Moench—Methodus (Moench) 420. 1794 [4 May 1794] (IK)

References

External links

Omphalodes